Haplogroup M is a human mitochondrial DNA (mtDNA) haplogroup. An enormous haplogroup spanning all the continents, the macro-haplogroup M, like its sibling the macro-haplogroup N, is a descendant of the haplogroup L3.

All mtDNA haplogroups considered native outside of Africa are descendants of either haplogroup M or its sibling haplogroup N. Haplogroup M is relatively young, having a younger most recent common ancestor date than some subclades of haplogroup N such as haplogroup R.

Origins
There is a debate concerning the geographical origins of Haplogroup M and its sibling haplogroup N. Both lineages are thought to have been the main surviving lineages involved in the out of Africa migration (or migrations) because all indigenous lineages found outside Africa belong to haplogroup M or haplogroup N. Scientists are unsure whether the mutations that define haplogroups M and N occurred in Africa before the exit from Africa or in Asia after the exit from Africa. Determining the origins of haplogroup M is further complicated by an early back-migration (from Asia to Africa) of bearers of M1.

Thus, haplogroup M would have emerged around 10,000 or at most 20,000 years after L3, around or somewhat after the recent out-of-Africa migration event.

Haplogroup M1

Much discussion concerning the origins of haplogroup M has been related to its subclade haplogroup M1, which is the only variant of macro-haplogroup M found in Africa. Two possibilities were being considered as potential explanations for the presence of M1 in Africa:

 M was present in the ancient population which later gave rise to both M1 in Africa, and M more generally found in Eurasia.
 The presence of M1 in Africa is the result of a back-migration from Asia which occurred sometime after the Out of Africa migration.

Haplogroup M23
In 2009, two independent publications reported a rare, deep-rooted subclade of haplogroup M, referred to as M23, that is present in Madagascar.

The contemporary populations of Madagascar were formed in the last 2,000 years by the admixture of Bantu and Indonesian (Austronesian) populations. M23 seems to be restricted to Madagascar, as it has not been detected anywhere else. M23 could have been brought to Madagascar from Asia where most deep rooted subclades of Haplogroup M are found.

Asian origin hypothesis
According to this theory, anatomically modern humans carrying ancestral haplogroup L3 lineages were involved in the Out of Africa migration from East Africa into Asia. Somewhere in Asia, the ancestral L3 lineages gave rise to haplogroups M and N. The ancestral L3 lineages were then lost by genetic drift as they are infrequent outside Africa. The hypothesis that Asia is the origin of macrohaplogroup M is supported by the following:

The highest frequencies worldwide of macrohaplogroup M are observed in Asia, specifically in Bangladesh, China, India, Japan, Korea and Nepal where frequencies range from 60 to 80%. The total frequency of M subclades is even higher in some populations of Siberia or the Americas, but these small populations tend to exhibit strong genetic drift effects, and often their geographical neighbors exhibit very different frequencies.
Deep time depth >50,000 years of western, central, southern and eastern Indian haplogroups M2, M38, M54, M58, M33, M6, M61, M62 and the distribution of macrohaplogroup M, do not rule out the possibility of macrohaplogroup M arising in Indian population.
With the exception of the African specific M1,  India has several M lineages that emerged directly from the root of haplogroup M.
Only two subclades of haplogroup M, M1 and M23, are found in Africa, whereas numerous subclades are found outside Africa (with some discussion possible only about sub-clade M1, concerning which see below).
Specifically concerning M1
Haplogroup M1 has a restricted geographic distribution in Africa, being found mainly in North Africans and East Africa at low or moderate frequencies. If M had originated in Africa around, or before, the Out of Africa migration, it would be expected to have a more widespread distribution 
According to Gonzalez et al. 2007, M1 appears to have expanded relatively recently. In this study M1 had a younger coalescence age than the Asian-exclusive M lineages.
The geographic distribution of M1 in Africa is predominantly North African/supra-equatorial and is largely confined to Afro-Asiatic speakers, which is inconsistent with the Sub-Saharan distribution of sub-clades of haplogroups L3 and L2 that have similar time depths.
One of the basal lineages of M1 lineages has been found in Northwest Africa and in the Near East but is absent in East Africa.
M1 is not restricted to Africa. It is relatively common in the Mediterranean, peaking in Iberia. M1 also enjoys a well-established presence in the Middle East, from the South of the Arabian Peninsula to Anatolia and from the Levant to Iran. In addition, M1 haplotypes have occasionally been observed in the Caucasus and the Trans Caucasus, and without any accompanying L lineages. M1 has also been detected in Central Asia, seemingly reaching as far as Tibet.
The fact that the M1 sub-clade of macrohaplogroup M has a coalescence age which overlaps with that of haplogroup U6 (a Eurasian haplogroup whose presence in Africa is due to a back-migration from West Asia) and the distribution of U6 in Africa is also restricted to the same North African and Horn African populations as M1 supports the scenario that M1 and U6 were part of the same population expansion from Asia to Africa.
The timing of the proposed migration of M1 and U6-carrying peoples from West Asia to Africa (between 40,000 to 45,000 ybp) is also supported by the fact that it coincides with changes in climatic conditions that reduced the desert areas of North Africa, thereby rendering the region more accessible to entry from the Levant. This climatic change also temporally overlaps with the peopling of Europe by populations bearing haplogroup U5, the European sister clade of haplogroup U6.

African origin hypothesis
According to this theory, haplogroups M and N arose from L3 in an East African population ancestral to eurasians that had been isolated from other African populations before the OOA event. Members of this population were involved in the out Africa migration and may have only carried M and N lineages. With the possible exception of haplogroup M1, all other M and N clades in Africa were lost due to admixture with other African populations and genetic drift.

The African origin of Haplogroup M is supported by the following arguments and evidence.
L3, the parent clade of haplogroup M, is found throughout Africa, but is rare outside Africa. According to Toomas Kivisild (2003), "the lack of L3 lineages other than M and N in India and among non-African mitochondria in general suggests that the earliest migration(s) of modern humans already carried these two mtDNA ancestors, via a departure route over the Horn of Africa."
Specifically concerning at least M1a:
This study provides evidence that M1, or its ancestor, had an Asiatic origin. The earliest M1 expansion into Africa occurred in northwestern instead of northeastern areas; this early spread reached the Iberian Peninsula even affecting the Basques. The majority of the M1a lineages found outside and inside Africa had a more recent eastern Africa origin. Both western and eastern M1 lineages participated in the Neolithic colonization of the Sahara. The striking parallelism between subclade ages and geographic distribution of M1 and its North African U6 counterpart strongly reinforces this scenario. Finally, a relevant fraction of M1a lineages present today in the European Continent and nearby islands possibly had a Jewish instead of the commonly proposed Arab/Berber maternal ascendance.

Dispersal
 
A number of studies have proposed that the ancestors of modern haplogroup M dispersed from Africa through the southern route across the Horn of Africa along the coastal regions of Asia onwards to New Guinea and Australia. These studies suggested that the migrations of haplogroups M and N occurred separately with haplogroup N heading northwards from East Africa to the Levant. However, the results of numerous recent studies indicate that there was only one migration out of Africa and that haplogroups M and N were part of the same migration. This is based on the analysis of a number of relict populations along the proposed beachcombing route from Africa to Australia, all of which possessed both haplogroups N and M.

A 2008 study by Abu-Amero et al., suggests that the Arabian Peninsula may have been the main route out of Africa. However, as the region lacks of autochthonous clades of haplogroups M and N the authors suggest that the area has been a more recent receptor of human migrations than an ancient demographic expansion center along the southern coastal route as proposed under the single migration Out-of-Africa scenario of the African origin hypothesis.

Distribution
M is the most common mtDNA haplogroup in Asia, super-haplogroup M is distributed all over Asia, where it represents 60% of all maternal lineages.

All Andamanese belong to Haplogroup M. It peaks in the Malaysian aboriginal Negrito tribes at almost 100% but with mtDNA M21a representing Semang; 84% in Mendriq people, Batek people 48%, (almost all belong to the specific Malaysian Negrito haplogroup M21a, this subclade also found in the Orang Asli 21%, Thais 7.8% and Malay 4.6%) It also peaks very high in Japan and Tibet, where it represents on average about 70% of the maternal lineages (160/216 = 74% Tibet, 205/282 = 73% Tōkai, 231/326 = 71% Okinawa, 148/211 = 70% Japanese, 50/72 = 69% Tibet, 150/217 = 69% Hokkaidō, 24/35 = 69% Zhongdian Tibetan, 175/256 = 68% northern Kyūshū, 38/56 = 68% Qinghai Tibetan, 16/24 = 67% Diqing Tibetan, 66/100 = 66% Miyazaki, 33/51 = 65% Ainu, 214/336 = 64% Tōhoku, 75/118 = 64% Tokyo (JPT)) and is ubiquitous in India and South Korea, where it has approximately 60% frequency. Among Chinese people both inside and outside of China, haplogroup M accounts for approximately 50% of all mtDNA on average, but the frequency varies from approximately 40% in Hans from Hunan and Fujian in southern China to approximately 60% in Shenyang, Liaoning in northeastern China.

Haplogroup M accounts for approximately 42% of all mtDNA in Filipinos, among whom it is represented mainly by M7c3c and E. In Vietnam, haplogroup M has been found in 37% (52/139) to 48% (20/42) of samples of Vietnamese and in 32% (54/168) of a sample of Chams from Bình Thuận Province. Haplogroup M accounts for 43% (92/214) of all mtDNA in a sample of Laotians, with its subclade M7 (M7b, M7c, and M7e) alone accounting for a full third of all haplogroup M, or 14.5% (31/214) of the total sample.

In Oceania,  A 2008 study found Haplogroup M in 42% (60/144) of a pool of samples from nine language groups in the Admiralty Islands of Papua New Guinea., M has been found in 35% (17/48) of a sample of Papua New Guinea highlanders from the Bundi area and in 28% (9/32) of a sample of Aboriginal Australians from Kalumburu in northwestern Australia. In a study published in 2015, Haplogroup M was found in 21% (18/86) of a sample of Fijians, but it was not observed in a sample of 21 Rotumans.

Haplogroup M is also relatively common in Northeast Africa, occurring especially among Somalis, Libyans and Oromos at frequencies over 20%. Toward the northwest, the lineage is found at comparable frequencies among the Tuareg in Mali and Burkina Faso; particularly the M1a2 subclade (18.42%).

Among the descendant lineages of haplogroup M are C, D, E, G, Q, and Z. Z and G are found in North Eurasian populations, C and D exists among North Eurasian and Native American populations, E is observed in Southeast Asian populations, and Q is common among Melanesian populations. The lineages M2, M3, M4, M5, M6, M18 and M25 are exclusive to South Asia, with M2 reported to be the oldest lineage on the Indian sub-continent with an age estimation of 60,000—75,000 years, and with M5 reported to be the most prevalent in historically Turco-Persian enclaves.

In 2013, four ancient specimens dated to around 2,500 BC-500 AD, which were excavated from the Tell Ashara (Terqa) and Tell Masaikh (Kar-Assurnasirpal) archaeological sites in the Euphrates Valley, were found to belong to mtDNA haplotypes associated with the M4b1, M49 and/or M61 haplogroups. Since these clades are not found among the current inhabitants of the area, they are believed to have been brought at a more remote period from east of Mesopotamia; possibly by either merchants or the founders of the ancient Terqa population.

In 2016, three Late Pleistocene European hunter-gatherers were also found to carry M lineages. Two of the specimens were from the Goyet archaeological site in Belgium and were dated to 34,000 and 35,000 years ago, respectively. The other ancient individual hailed from the La Rochette site in France, and was dated to 28,000 years ago.

Ancient DNA analysis of Iberomaurusian skeletal remains at the Taforalt site in Morocco, which have been dated to between 15,100 and 13,900 ybp, observed the M1b subclade in one of the fossils (1/7; ~14%). Ancient individuals belonging to the Late Iron Age settlement of Çemialo Sırtı in Batman, southeast Turkey were found to carry haplogroup M; specifically the M1a1 subclade (1/12; ~8.3%). Haplogroup M was also detected in ancient specimens from Southeast Anatolia (0.4%). Additionally, M1 has been observed among ancient Egyptian mummies excavated at the Abusir el-Meleq archaeological site in Middle Egypt, which date from the Pre-Ptolemaic/late New Kingdom and Roman periods. Fossils at the Early Neolithic site of Ifri n'Amr or Moussa in Morocco, which have been dated to around 5,000 BCE, have also been found to carry the M1b subclade. These ancient individuals bore an autochthonous Maghrebi genomic component that peaks among modern Berbers, indicating that they were ancestral to populations in the area. The ancient Egyptian aristocrats Nakht-Ankh and Khnum-Nakht were also found to belong to the M1a1 subclade. The half-brothers lived during the 12th Dynasty, with their tomb located at the Deir Rifeh cemetery in Middle Egypt.

Subgroups distribution

Haplogroup M1  – found in the Nile Valley, Horn of Africa, North Africa, Sahara, Mediterranean, and Middle East
M20 – in China, Borneo (Bidayuh), Thailand, Laos, Indonesia, Vietnam (Jarai, Lahu), Saudi Arabia
M20a - Myanmar, Thailand (Shan from Mae Hong Son Province, Tai Yuan), China, Blang, Saudi Arabia, 
M20a1 - Thailand (Lawa from southeastern Mae Hong Son Province), Myanmar
M20a2 - Thailand (Phutai from Kalasin Province, Nyaw from Nakhon Phanom Province, Bru from Sakon Nakhon Province, etc.)
M20a3 - Madagascar, USA (New Jersey)
M51 – in Cambodia and Indonesia
Haplogroup M2  – found in South Asia, with highest concentrations in SE India and Bangladesh; oldest haplogroup M lineage on the Indian sub-continent. Also found with low frequency in southwestern China.
M2a'b
M2a – India (Madhya Pradesh), Munda; most common in Bangladesh
M2a1 – Malpaharia
M2a1a – Uyghur, Sindhi, Hill Kolam, Thailand
M2a1a1 – Katkari
M2a1a1a – Nihal
M2a1a1a1 – Katkari
M2a1a1b – Nihal
M2a1a1b1 – Nihal
M2a1a2 – Madia
M2a1a2a – Madia
M2a1a2a1 – Kamar
M2a1a2a1a – Kamar
M2a1a3 – Mathakur
M2a1a3a – Kathakur, Mathakur
M2a1a3a1 – Kathakur
M2a1a3b – Kathakur
M2a1b – Dungri Bhil
M2a1c – Andh
M2b – Paudi Bhuiya; most common in SE India
M2b1 – Korku
M2b1a – Korku, Munda
M2b1b – Malpaharia
M2b2 – Hill Kolam, Jenu Kuruba
M2b3 – Betta Kurumba
M2b3a – Betta Kurumba
M2b4 – Korku
M2c – Myanmar, Thailand/Laos
Haplogroup M3 – Uyghur, Myanmar, New Delhi (Hindu), Paniya  – found mainly in South Asia, with highest concentrations in west and NW India
M3a
M3a1 – Dongri Bhil, Kathodi, Katkari, Jammu and Kashmir, Pathan, Iran, Thailand/Laos
M3a1a – Kamar of Chhattisgarh
M3a1b
M3a1b* – Sarikolis and Wakhis in Taxkorgan, Pakistan (Balochi, Makrani), India
M3a1b1
M3a1b1* – Jammu and Kashmir
M3a1b1a – Pakistan (Hazara)
M3a1b2 – Pakistan (Brahui), Iran (Persian)
M3a2 – Bangladesh, Jammu and Kashmir, Burusho, Qatar, Yemen
M3a2a – Jenu Kuruba
M3b – Kamar of Chhattisgarh
M3c – Madia, Myanmar
M3c1
M3c1a – Jammu and Kashmir, Nepal (Terai Hindu, Tharu), Andhra Pradesh (tribal)
M3c1b – Hill Kolam
M3c1b1 – Saudi Arabia
M3c1b1a – Jenu Kuruba
M3c1b1b – Jenu Kuruba
M3c2 – Pakistan (Brahui), Jammu and Kashmir, Andh, Thailand
M3d – Nepal (Kathmandu), India, Italy (Salerno)
M3d1 – New Delhi (Hindu)
M3d1a – Nepal (Kathmandu), Cambodia (Lao), United Kingdom
M3d1a1 – Tibet (Sherpa)
M4'30
Haplogroup M4  – found mainly in South Asia but some sequences in Eastern Saudi Arabia
Haplogroup M4a – found in Gujarat, India
Haplogroup M4b – found among ancient specimens in the Euphrates valley
Haplogroup M65
Haplogroup M65a – found in India, Pakistan (Balochi, Sindhi), Sarikoli in Taxkorgan, Xinjiang, China, Pamiri in Gorno-Badakhshan, Tajikistan, Ladakh, Myanmar, China
Haplogroup M65b – found in India and in Pakistan (Balochi)
Haplogroup M30 – mainly in India; also found in Nepal, Pakistan, Central Asia (Kyrgyz, Wakhi, and Sarikoli in Taxkorgan, Xinjiang, China and Tajiks in Dushanbe, Tajikistan), the Middle East, and North Africa.
Haplogroup M18'38
Haplogroup M18 – found among Tharus in southern Nepal and tribal people in Andhra Pradesh Haplogroup M18a was also found in Mesolithic Sri Lanka.
Haplogroup M38 – found with high frequency among Tharus from Morang District of southeastern Nepal and as singletons among Tharus from Chitwan District of south-central Nepal and Hindus from New Delhi
Haplogroup M37
Haplogroup M37a – found in Gujarat, India
Haplogroup M5  – found in South Asia
Haplogroup M5a – found in India (Jammu and Kashmir, Madhya Pradesh, Kathakur, Gadaba), Thailand (Mon in Ratchaburi Province and Lopburi Province), Israel, Kyrgyz in Taxkorgan
M5a1
M5a1a – India (incl. Jammu and Kashmir)
M5a1b – India (Jammu and Kashmir, Dongri Bhil, Nihal, Andh), Pakistan (Burusho), Russia, Spain (Romani), USA (Georgia), USA (California)
M5a2 – India
M5a2a – Pakistan (Balochi), India (Nihal), Thailand (Tai Yuan in Uttaradit Province)
M5a2a1 – India (Hindus in New Delhi), Pakistan (Sindhi)
M5a2a1a – Saudi Arabia, Iran (Persian), Kazakh, Pakistan (Balochi), India (Dongri Bhil, Korku, Lachungpa), Myanmar
M5a2a2 – India (Kamar of Chhattisgarh), Yemen
M5a2a3 – India (Pauri Bhuiya, Munda)
M5a2a4 – Iran (Persians), Pakistan (Brahui, Makrani, Balochi)
M5a3
M5a3a – India (Kamar of Chhattisgarh)
M5a3b – India (Dongri Bhil, Kathodi)
M5a4 – India (Kathodi, Korku)
M5a5 – India (Dongri Bhil, Andh), Yemen
Haplogroup M5b – found in India and Thailand (Khon Mueang in Chiang Mai Province)
Haplogroup M5b2b1a – found in Tibet, Ladakh, Nepal
Haplogroup M5c – found in India, Thailand (Mon in Lopburi Province and Nakhon Ratchasima Province), Tibet, Nepal
Haplogroup M5c1 – India (Pauri Bhuiya, Kathodi, etc.), Thailand (Thai from Phichit Province)
Haplogroup M5c2 – Nepal (Tharu), Tibet (Sherpa), Thailand (Mon from Nakhon Ratchasima Province)
Haplogroup M6  – found mainly in South Asia, with highest concentrations in mid-eastern India and Kashmir
Haplogroup M6b – found in Kerala, India
Haplogroup M61 – found among ancient specimens in the Euphrates valley
Haplogroup M7  – found in East Asia and Southeast Asia, especially in Japan, southern China, Vietnam, Laos, and Thailand; also found with low frequency in Central Asia and Siberia
Haplogroup M7a
Haplogroup M7a* – Japan
Haplogroup M7a1
Haplogroup M7a1* – Japan, Jiangsu, Shandong
Haplogroup M7a1a
Haplogroup M7a1a* – Japan, Korea, Beijing, Hebei, Henan, Sichuan, Shanghai, Shandong
Haplogroup M7a1a1
Haplogroup M7a1a1* – Japan, Korea, Jiangsu, Shandong, Liaoning, Henan
Haplogroup M7a1a1a – Japan
Haplogroup M7a1a2
Haplogroup M7a1a2* – Japan, Jiangsu
Haplogroup M7a1a2a – Japan
Haplogroup M7a1a3 – Japan
Haplogroup M7a1a4
Haplogroup M7a1a4* – Japan, Zhejiang
Haplogroup M7a1a4a – Japan
Haplogroup M7a1a5
Haplogroup M7a1a5* – Japan
Haplogroup M7a1a5a – Japan, Korea, Tianjin
Haplogroup M7a1a6
Haplogroup M7a1a6* – Japan, Philippines, Jiangsu, Shanxi, Shandong
Haplogroup M7a1a6a – Japan
Haplogroup M7a1a7
Haplogroup M7a1a7* – Japan, Korea
Haplogroup M7a1a7a – Uyghur
Haplogroup M7a1a8 – Japan, Jiangsu
Haplogroup M7a1a9 – Japan, Korea, Tianjin
Haplogroup M7a1a10 – Japan
Haplogroup M7a1b
Haplogroup M7a1b1
Haplogroup M7a1b1* – Japan, China (Minnan Han)
Haplogroup M7a1b1a – Japan
Haplogroup M7a1b2 – Japan
Haplogroup M7a2
Haplogroup M7a2* – Japan
Haplogroup M7a2a – Japan, Ulchi, Yakut
Haplogroup M7a2a1 – Japan
Haplogroup M7a2a2
Haplogroup M7a2a2* – Japan
Haplogroup M7a2a2a
Haplogroup M7a2a2a* – Japan (Gunma)
Haplogroup M7a2a2a1 – Japan (Aichi)
Haplogroup M7a2a3
Haplogroup M7a2a3a
Haplogroup M7a2a3a* – Udihe
Haplogroup M7a2a3a1 – Udihe
Haplogroup M7a2a3b – Evenk (Nyukzha River basin), Buryat
Haplogroup M7a2a4 – Japan
Haplogroup M7b'c
Haplogroup M7b
Haplogroup M7b1a
Haplogroup M7b1a1 – Thailand, Laos, Vietnam, Cambodia, Myanmar, Indonesia, China, Karakalpak, Kyrgyz, Mongush, Khamnigan
Haplogroup M7b1a1a – Thailand, Uyghur, Korea
Haplogroup M7b1a1a1 – Japan, Korea, China, Tajikistan, Thailand, Laos
Haplogroup M7b1a1a1a – Japan
Haplogroup M7b1a1a1b – Japan, Korea, China, Russia, Kyrgyzstan
Haplogroup M7b1a1a1c – Japan
Haplogroup M7b1a1a1d – Japan
Haplogroup M7b1a1a2 – Thailand, Vietnam, Malaysia, China
Haplogroup M7b1a1a3 – Thailand, Laos, Vietnam, China
Haplogroup M7b1a1b – Thailand, Laos, Vietnam, China (Hunan, Uyghur, Kyrgyz from Artux), England
Haplogroup M7b1a1c – Han Chinese, Uyghurs, Kyrgyz
Haplogroup M7b1a1c1 – Chinese, Bama Yao Autonomous County
Haplogroup M7b1a1d – Thailand, Laos, Tatar (Buinsk)
Haplogroup M7b1a1e – Thailand
Haplogroup M7b1a1e1 – Thailand, Vietnam, China
Haplogroup M7b1a1e2 – China
Haplogroup M7b1a1f – Thailand, Malaysia, Indonesia, Vietnam, China
Haplogroup M7b1a1g – Thailand
Haplogroup M7b1a1h – Thailand, Chinese (Han from Lanzhou, etc.), Vietnam, Korea, Japan
Haplogroup M7b1a1i – Taiwan (Amis), Philippines, Malaysia
Haplogroup M7b1a2
Haplogroup M7b1a2a – China (Uyghurs, Kyrgyzes in Taxkorgan, Han, Mongol in Inner Mongolia)
Haplogroup M7b1a2a1 – Taiwan Aboriginal peoples, Philippines, Indonesia, Malaysia
Haplogroup M7b1a2a1a – Atayal, Saisiyat
Haplogroup M7b1a2a1b – Atayal
Haplogroup M7b1a2a1b1 – Atayal, Saisiyat
Haplogroup M7b1b – Khamnigan, China, Kyrgyz
Haplogroup M7c
Haplogroup M7c1 – China, Vietnam, Malaysia, Mongolia, Sarikoli, Kazakhstan
Haplogroup M7c1a – China, Korea, Japan, Vietnam, Thailand, Indonesia
Haplogroup M7c1a1
Haplogroup M7c1a1a – China, Mongolia
Haplogroup M7c1a1b – Azeri
Haplogroup M7c1a1b1 – Even (Sakkyryyr), Yakut (Vilyuy basin)
Haplogroup M7c1a2 – China
Haplogroup M7c1a2a – She, Uyghur
Haplogroup M7c1a2a1 – Japan, Korea, Uyghur
Haplogroup M7c1a3 – China, Japan, Vietnam
Haplogroup M7c1a3a – Korea
Haplogroup M7c1a4
Haplogroup M7c1a4a – China
Haplogroup M7c1a4b – China
Haplogroup M7c1a5 – Japan, Korea
Haplogroup M7c1b – Chinese
Haplogroup M7c1b1 – Buryats
Haplogroup M7c1b2
Haplogroup M7c1b2a – Khamnigan, Korea
Haplogroup M7c1b2b – China, Thailand, Laos, Malaysia
Haplogroup M7c1c – China, Thailand/Laos
Haplogroup M7c1c1 – China
Haplogroup M7c1c1a – China
Haplogroup M7c1c1a1 – Philippines
Haplogroup M7c1c2 – Thailand, China (Han)
Haplogroup M7c1c3 – Taiwan, Thailand, Philippines, Indonesia, Brunei, Malaysia, Kiribati, Nauru, Saudi Arabia, Madagascar
Haplogroup M7c2 – Taiwan, Hainan, Thailand/Laos
Haplogroup M7c2a – Thailand/Laos, China (incl. Hainan)
Haplogroup M7c2b – Thailand, Taiwan (Han), Czech
Haplogroup M7c3 – China (incl. Amis)
Haplogroup M8 - China, Northern Thailand (Lisu), India
Haplogroup M8a:  – found in East Asia, Central Asia, and Siberia
Haplogroup M8a1
Haplogroup M8a1a – Japan
Haplogroup M8a1b – southeastern Siberia (Udegey)
Haplogroup M8a2'3
Haplogroup M8a2'3* – Japan
Haplogroup M8a2 – found in Koryaks, Itelmens, Chukchis, Tuvans, Khakassians, Altayans, Mongolians, China (including Uyghurs), Koreans, Japan, Thailand/Laos
Haplogroup M8a2* – China (Hakka)
Haplogroup M8a2-T152C!!!
Haplogroup M8a2-T152C!!!* – China, Japan (Chiba)
Haplogroup M8a2a
Haplogroup M8a2a1 – found in Thailand, China, Japan
Haplogroup M8a2a1a
Haplogroup M8a2a1a* – Northeast Thailand (Saek)
Haplogroup M8a2a1a1
Haplogroup M8a2a1a1* – China (Han from Wuhan)
Haplogroup M8a2a1a1a – Central Thailand (Tai Yuan), Northern Thailand (Palaung)
Haplogroup M8a2a1b
Haplogroup M8a2a1b* – Chiang Mai Province (Khon Mueang)
Haplogroup M8a2a1b1 – Lamphun Province (Khon Mueang)
Haplogroup M8a2a1c – China, Japan (Aichi)
Haplogroup M8a2a2 – China
Haplogroup M8a2-A12530G/G14364A/T16297C – Uyghur
Haplogroup M8a2b – found in Japan, China, Ulchi
Haplogroup M8a2c – found in Japan and China
Haplogroup M8a2d – found in China (Shantou, Qingdao)
Haplogroup M8a2e – found in Taiwan (Ami, etc.) and in a Han Chinese living in the Denver, Colorado metropolitan area
Haplogroup M8a2f – China
Haplogroup M8a3
Haplogroup M8a3* – China (Guangdong, etc.), Kyrgyz (Artux), Russia (Verkhnyaya Gutara, Nerkha, and Kushun villages of Irkutsk Oblast)
Haplogroup M8a3a
Haplogroup M8a3a* – China, Russia (Ket from Turukhansk)
Haplogroup M8a3a1
Haplogroup M8a3a1* – China
Haplogroup M8a3a1a – China
Haplogroup M8a3a2 – China, Indonesia (Jawa Timur)
Haplogroup CZ - Northern Thailand (Hmong)
Haplogroup C  – found especially in Siberia
Haplogroup C1  – found in Asia and America (Native Americans and Hispanics in particular)
Haplogroup C4
Haplogroup C7  – found in China and Ukraine. 
Haplogroup Z  – found in Northeast Europe, Siberia, Central Asia, and East Asia, including among Swedes, Sami, Finns, Russians, Ukrainians, Nogais, Abazins, Cherkessians, North Ossetians, Turks, Udmurts, Komi, Kets, Kalmyks, Hazara, Pashtuns, Tajiks, Turkmens, Uzbeks, Kazakhs, Kyrgyz, Uyghurs, Evens, Evenks, Dolgans, Yakuts, Yukaghirs, Khakas, Altaians, Altai Kizhi, Buryats, Nganasans, Koryaks, Itelmens, Ulchi, Japanese, Koreans, Chinese, and Tibeto-Burman peoples
Haplogroup M9  – found in East Asia and Central Asia, especially in Tibet. In the Nepalese populations, it is prevalent mainly in Sherpa (27.4%), Tharu-CI (19.6%), Tamang (15.5%), Magar (13.5%), and Tharu-CII. Haplogroup M9* has additionally been found in ancient remains from the Red Deer Cave people in present-day Yunnan.
Haplogroup M9a'b
Haplogroup M9a – Han (Guangdong, Guangxi, Yunnan, Sichuan, Hunan, Taiwan, Anhui, Shaanxi, Shandong, Hebei), Korean (South Korea), Tujia (Hunan), Kinh (Hue), Mongol (Hohhot), Japanese, Lhoba [TMRCA 23,000 (95% CI 18,100 <-> 28,800) ybp]
Haplogroup M9a1 – Han (Hunan) [TMRCA 19,500 (95% CI 13,800 <-> 26,700) ybp]
Haplogroup M9a1a – Han (Hebei, Henan, Shaanxi, Anhui, Zhejiang, Hunan, Yunnan, Guangdong, Hong Kong, Taiwan), Manchu (Jilin), Korean (South Korea), Hui (Qinghai), Kazakh (Ili), Kyrgyz (Kyrgyzstan), Nepal [TMRCA 16,500 (95% CI 12,800 <-> 20,900) ybp]
Haplogroup M9a1a1 – Han (Henan, Shaanxi, Guangdong, Guangxi, Sichuan, Yunnan), Taiwan, Thailand/Laos, Hui (Yuxi), Tibetan (Nyingchi), Uyghur, Japanese (Hokkaido) [TMRCA 13,900 (95% CI 10,800 <-> 17,600) ybp]
Haplogroup M9a1a1a – Japanese, Korean (Seoul), Chinese (incl. a Henan Han), Khamnigan (Buryat Republic), Udege, Nivkh, Tibetan (Qinghai)
Haplogroup M9a1a1b – Japanese, Korean (South Korea), Mongol (Inner Mongolia), Han (Hunan)
Haplogroup M9a1a1c – Han (Gansu, Shaanxi, Henan, Liaoning, Zhejiang, Jiangxi, Hunan, Guangdong, Sichuan, Yunnan), Ainu, Japanese, Korean, Mongol (Hohhot), Uyghur (Ürümqi), Altaian, Tuvinian, Hui (Xinjiang, Kyrgyzstan), Tujia (Hunan), Bai (Yunnan), Yi (Yunnan)
Haplogroup M9a1a1c1 – Han (Henan)
Haplogroup M9a1a1c1a – Han (Henan, Anhui, Shandong, Liaoning, Sichuan, Yunnan, Xinjiang, Lanzhou), Korea, Japanese, Mongol (New Barga Left Banner), Tibetan (Liangshan), Hui (Ili)
Haplogroup M9a1a1c1b – Tibetan (Gansu, Qinghai, Sichuan, Yunnan, Chamdo, Lhasa, Nagqu, Ngari, Nyingchi, Shannan, Shigatse), Monpa (Nyingchi), Dirang Monpa (Arunachal Pradesh), Lachungpa (Sikkim), Tu (Huzhu Tu Autonomous County), Dongxiang (Gansu), Buryat (Inner Mongolia, Buryat Republic), Han (Qinghai), Hui (Qinghai), Nepalese
Haplogroup M9a1a1d – Salar (Qinghai), Han (Yanting), Bai (Dali)
Haplogroup M9a1a2 – Tharu (Chitwan District, Uttar Pradesh), Tibetan (Nagqu, Yunnan, Qinghai, Shigatse), Lhoba (Nyingchi), Dhimal (West Bengal), Chin (Myanmar), Adi (Assam), Tu (Qinghai), Uyghur (Ürümqi), Mongol (Ili), Han (Hunan, Shanxi, Sichuan, Yunnan, Shandong, Ili), Yi (Yunnan), Bai (Dali), Nepalese [TMRCA 6,153.9 ± 5,443.2 ybp; CI=95%]
Haplogroup M9a1b – Tibetan (Nyingchi, Nagqu, Lhasa, Chamdo, Ngari, Shannan, Shigatse, Sichuan, Yunnan, Qinghai, Gansu), Monba (Nyingchi), Lhoba (Shannan), Uzbekistan (Fergana), Dongxiang (Linxia), Naga (Sagaing), Burman (Bago), Chin (Chin State), Han (Hunan, Sichuan, Yunnan, Liaoning), Yi (Shuangbai) [TMRCA 9,416.6 ± 3,984.0 ybp; CI=95%]
Haplogroup M9a1b1 – Tibetan, Lhoba, Arunachal Pradesh (Sonowal Kachari, Wanchoo, Gallong), Assam (Adi), Sikkim (Lepcha, Lachung), Qinghai (Salar, Tu), Mongol (Mongolia, Inner Mongolia), Guangxi (Gelao, Palyu), Thailand, Bengal, Pakistan (Karachi), Meghalaya (Khasi, Garo), Bodo (West Bengal), Rabha (West Bengal), Rajbanshi (West Bengal), Indonesia, Han (Shaanxi, Henan, Gansu, Sichuan, Yunnan), Hui (Gansu, Qinghai), Burman (Ayeyarwady, Magway, Sagaing), Rakhine (Rakhine, Magway), Chin (Chin State), Naga (Sagaing), Mech (Jhapa district, Nepal), Nepalese, Mosuo (Yunnan), Yi (Yunnan), She (Guizhou), Hani (Yunnan), Pumi (Yunnan), Bai (Dali), Va (Yunnan) [TMRCA 6,557.4 ± 2,102.4 ybp; CI=95%]
Haplogroup M9a1b2 – Tibetan (Diqing), Han (Dujiangyan), Kazakh (Altai Republic), Kalmyk [TMRCA 3,225.9 ± 3,494.4 ybp; CI=95%]
Haplogroup M9a4
Haplogroup M9a4a – Kinh (Hanoi), Han (Shaanxi, Shandong, Zhejiang, Taiwan, Sichuan, Guangdong), Li (Hainan), Mulam (Guangxi), Jino (Xishuangbanna), Dai (Xishuangbanna), Chiang Mai
Haplogroup M9a4b – Kinh (Hanoi), South Korea
Haplogroup M9a5 – Han (Hunan, Hong Kong), Thailand, Pubiao (Malipo), Li (Hainan), Mulam (Luocheng), Zhuang (Bama Yao Autonomous County), Kinh (Hanoi)
Haplogroup M9b – Han (Luocheng, Dujiangyan, Shaanxi), Cham (Binh Thuan), Mulam (Luocheng), Bouyei (Guizhou), Yi (Hezhang), Bunu (Dahua), Hui (Ili), Thailand (Phuan from Sukhothai Province)
Haplogroup E – a subclade of M9 – found especially in Taiwan (Aboriginal peoples), Maritime Southeast Asia, and the Mariana Islands [TMRCA 23,695.4 ± 6,902.4 ybp; CI=95%]
Haplogroup M10  – small clade found in East Asia, Southeast Asia, Bangladesh, Central Asia, Saudi Arabia, southern Siberia, Russia, Belarus, and Poland [TMRCA 23,600 (95% CI 17,100 <-> 31,700) ybp]
M10-514C!/A15218G/C16362T!
M10-514C!/A15218G/C16362T!* – Poland
M10-T3167C/C4140T/T8793C/C12549T/A13152G/T14502C/C15040T/T15071C
M10a [TMRCA 16,700 (95% CI 11,800 <-> 22,800) ybp]
M10a* – Myanmar
M10a1 – China, Thailand, Myanmar, Japan, Shor, Daur [TMRCA 14,400 (95% CI 11,100 <-> 18,400) ybp]
M10a1* – Myanmar, Central Thailand (Mon), Japan (Aichi)
M10a1-G16129A!!!
M10a1-A13105G!/T16362C – Shor, Daur
M10a1a
M10a1a* – China, Saudi Arabia
M10a1a1
M10a1a1a – Mongolia, Korea, Japan, China (Han from Kunming, etc.), Iron Age Black Sea Scythian
M10a1a1b – Altai, Korea, Japan, China
M10a1a1b* – Chinese Uyghur
M10a1a1b1
M10a1a1b1* – Japan, China
M10a1a1b1a – China
M10a1a1b1b – China
M10a1a1b1c – Uyghur, Altai-Kizhi
M10a1a1b2
M10a1a1b2* – Taiwan (Hakka)
M10a1a1b2a – Japan
M10a1a2 – Northern Thailand (Khon Mueang from Lamphun Province)
M10a1a3 – Taiwan
M10a1b
M10a1b* – South Korea, China (Han from Tai'an, etc.), India (Gallong, etc.)
M10a1b1 – China (Makatao)
M10a1b2 – China (Tingri County)
M10a1c – China
M10a2 – Japan (Aichi), Kalmyk, Russian (northwestern Russia)
M10b – China (Shui), Vietnam (Cờ Lao)
Haplogroup M11  – small clade found especially among the Chinese and also in some Japanese, Koreans, Oroqen, Yi, Tibetans, Tajiks in Dushanbe, Tajikistan, and Bangladeshis [TMRCA 20,987.7 ± 5,740.8 ybp; CI=95%]
Haplogroup M11* – Myanmar
Haplogroup M11a'b'd
Haplogroup M11a'b [TMRCA 16,209.0 ± 4,396.8 ybp; CI=95%]
Haplogroup M11a – Korea, Turkey [TMRCA 11,972.3 ± 3,523.2 ybp; CI=95%]
Haplogroup M11a-C198T
Haplogroup M11a-C198T* – Wancho, Miao (from Fenghuang, Hunan)
Haplogroup M11a1 – Gallong, Tibet [TMRCA 8,668.6 ± 4,041.6 ybp; CI=95%]
Haplogroup M11a2 – Tibet, Han (Zhanjiang) [TMRCA 8,776.3 ± 3,715.2 ybp; CI=95%]
Haplogroup M11a3 – Uyghur, Buryat, Oroqen
Haplogroup M11b [TMRCA 12,962.0 ± 4,819.2 ybp; CI=95%]
Haplogroup M11b1 – Taiwan (Minnan)
Haplogroup M11b1a – Japan
Haplogroup M11b1a1 – Japan, Han (Tai'an)
Haplogroup M11b2 – Japanese (Hokkaido), China, Altai-Kizhi, Tajik (Dushanbe)
Haplogroup M11d – China, Teleut, Kyrgyz, Iran
Haplogroup M11c – Japan, Korea
Haplogroup M12'G
Haplogroup M12  – small clade found especially among the aborigines of Hainan Island as well as in other populations of China, Japan, Korea, Pashtuns, Tibet, Myanmar, Thailand, Cambodia, and Vietnam [TMRCA 31,287.5 ± 5,731.2 ybp; CI=95%]
Haplogroup M12a [TMRCA 26,020.6 ± 5,808.0 ybp; CI=95%]
Haplogroup M12a1 – Thailand/Laos
Haplogroup M12a1a – Thailand (Htin in Phayao Province, Black Tai in Kanchanaburi Province, Mon in Kanchanaburi Province, Khon Mueang in Chiang Mai Province), Laos (Lao in Luang Prabang), Hainan
Haplogroup M12a1a1 – China (esp. Hainan)
Haplogroup M12a1a2 – Hainan, Tu
Haplogroup M12a1b – Tibet, Thailand (Blang in Chiang Rai Province, Khon Mueang in Chiang Rai Province, Palaung in Chiang Mai Province, Mon in Kanchanaburi Province), Hainan, Vietnam
Haplogroup M12a2 – Thailand, Hainan, Myanmar
Haplogroup M12b – Thailand (Khmu in Nan Province)
Haplogroup M12b1 – Vietnam, Myanmar
Haplogroup M12b1a – Laos (Lao in Vientiane)
Haplogroup M12b1a1
Haplogroup M12b1a2 – Thailand (Soa in Sakon Nakhon Province)
Haplogroup M12b1a2a – Cambodia, Malaysia
Haplogroup M12b1a2b – Cambodia
Haplogroup M12b1b – Thailand (Suay in Surin Province, Khmer in Surin Province, Lao Isan in Roi Et Province, Black Tai in Loei Province), Cambodia
Haplogroup M12b2 – Thailand, Hainan
Haplogroup M12b2a – Cambodia
Haplogroup G  – found especially in Japan, Mongolia, and Tibet and in indigenous peoples of Kamchatka (Koryaks, Alyutors, Itelmens), with some isolated instances in diverse places of Asia [TMRCA 31,614.8 ± 5,193.6 ybp; CI=95%]
Haplogroup G1 – Japan [TMRCA 21,492.9 ± 5,414.4 ybp; CI=95%]
Haplogroup G1a – China (Uyghurs), Thailand (Black Lahu in Mae Hong Son Province) [TMRCA 18,139.1 ± 5,462.4 ybp; CI=95%] (TMRCA 18,800 [95% CI 12,600 <-> 26,900] ybp)
Haplogroup G1a1 – Korea, Vietnam (Dao), China (Sarikolis, Uyghurs, etc.), Tajikistan (Pamiris), Russia (Todzhin) [TMRCA 12,200 (95% CI 10,100 <-> 14,600) ybp]
Haplogroup G1a1a – Japan, Korea, Taiwan [TMRCA 5,200 (95% CI 3,800 <-> 7,000) ybp]
Haplogroup G1a1a1 – Japan, Korea, China (Daur, Korean in Arun Banner) (TMRCA 3,100 [95% CI 1,250 <-> 6,300] ybp)
Haplogroup G1a1a2 – Japan
Haplogroup G1a1a3 – Japan
Haplogroup G1a1a4 – Japan, Korea
Haplogroup G1a1b – Taiwan (Makatao), Russia (Altai-Kizhi)
Haplogroup G1a2'3
Haplogroup G1a2 – Manchu, Han (Beijing), Tibet, Miao
Haplogroup G1a3 – Japan, Korea [TMRCA 6,451.1 ± 4,521.6 ybp; CI=95%]
Haplogroup G1b [TMRCA 7,246.3 ± 5,088.0 ybp; CI=95%] (TMRCA 10,300 [95% CI 7,000 <-> 14,700] ybp)
Haplogroup G1b1 – (TMRCA 8,400 [95% CI 6,200 <-> 11,100] ybp) Koryaks (Magadan Oblast, Severo-Evensk District of Magadan Oblast), Nivkhs, Evens (Kamchatka), Yakut (HGDP)
Haplogroup G1b2'3'4 (G1b-G16129A!) – (TMRCA 7,700 [95% CI 5,000 <-> 11,400] ybp) Evenks (Iengra), Evens (Magadan region), Orok, Nivkhs, Koryaks (Magadan Oblast, Severo-Evensk District of Magadan Oblast, Kamchatka)
Haplogroup G1b2 – (TMRCA 2,600 [95% CI 375 <-> 9,300] ybp) Koryaks (Magadan region, Severo-Evensk District of Magadan Region), Chukchi
Haplogroup G1b3 – (TMRCA 4,700 [95% CI 1,000 <-> 13,500] ybp) Chukchi (Anadyr), Evens (Kamchatka)
Haplogroup G1b4 – (TMRCA 1,450 [95% CI 225 <-> 5,100] ybp) Yukaghirs, Even (Tompo)
Haplogroup G1c – Korea (Seoul), China (Han from Lanzhou, etc.), Thailand (Black and Red Lahu in Mae Hong Son Province), Malaysia (Seletar) [TMRCA 12,910.6 ± 6,009.6 ybp; CI=95%] (TMRCA 17,200 [95% CI 11,600 <-> 24,600] ybp)
Haplogroup G1c1 – Han (Sichuan, Tai'an)
Haplogroup G1c2 – China (including at least one Han from Beijing)
Haplogroup G2 – Cambodia [TMRCA 26,787.5 ± 4,617.6 ybp; CI=95%]
Haplogroup G2a'c – China, USA
Haplogroup G2a [TMRCA 17,145.5 ± 5,270.4 ybp; CI=95%]
Haplogroup G2a1 – Korea, China (Hebei, Eastern China), Tibetans (Chamdo, Lhasa, Tingri), Uyghur (Artux), Daur, India (Ladakh, Punjabi Hindu), Myanmar (Bamar from Kayin State), Thailand, Singapore, Kyrgyz, Kazakhstan, Afghanistan (Balkh), Israel (haMerkaz), Saudi Arabia, Russia (Chelyabinsk Oblast, Taimyr Evenk, Tuvinian), Belarus (Lipka Tatars), Norway, USA ("caucasian") [TMRCA 14,045.7 ± 4,742.4 ybp; CI=95%]
Haplogroup G2a1a (C12525T) - Georgia (Abkhaz), Karachay (Karachay-Cherkess Republic), Yakuts (Central), Buryat (Inner Mongolia)
Haplogroup G2a1b (A12753G)
Haplogroup G2a1b1 (T146C! * G207A * T8063C * G9266A * A15758G) - Japan
Haplogroup G2a1b2 (A8832C) - Thailand (Mon from Central Thailand)
Haplogroup G2a1b3 (T16126C) - Thailand (Tai Khuen from North Thailand)
Haplogroup G2a1b3a (A7606G) - Thailand (Thai from Central Thailand)
Haplogroup G2a1-T16189C! - China (Han from Yili, Tibetan from Shigatse), Korea, Japan, Vietnam (Nung), Georgian
Haplogroup G2a1-T16189C!-A16194G - Japan (Aichi)
Haplogroup G2a1c – Japan, Korea
Haplogroup G2a1c1 – Japan
Haplogroup G2a1c2 – Japan
Haplogroup G2a1-T16189C!-C3654T - Eastern China
Haplogroup G2a1-T16189C!-G16526A - Uyghurs
Haplogroup G2a1-T16189C!-T15784C - Korea
Haplogroup G2a1-T16189C!-T15784C-T7609C - China, India (Lachungpa)
Haplogroup G2a1d – Kyrgyz (Artux), Uzbek (Uzbekistan), Poland [TMRCA 7,303.3 ± 3,657.6 ybp; CI=95%]
Haplogroup G2a1d1 – Japan, Hong Kong
Haplogroup G2a1d1a – Japan
Haplogroup G2a1d2 – Thailand (Thai from Ratchaburi Province), China (Shandong), India, England
Haplogroup G2a1d2a – Thailand (Tai Yuan from Ratchaburi Province and Chiang Mai Province, Palaung from Chiang Mai Province, Lisu from Mae Hong Son Province), China (Yao, Eastern China)
Haplogroup G2a1d2c - China (Eastern China), Thailand (Thai from Central Thailand)
Haplogroup G2a1e – Japan, Korea
Haplogroup G2a1f - China (Taihang area in Henan province)
Haplogroup G2a1g – China, Mongols, Karakalpak
Haplogroup G2a1-G13194A - Tibetan (Tingri)
Haplogroup G2a1h - India (Ladakh, Wancho), China (Fujian) 
Haplogroup G2a1i - Lhoba
Haplogroup G2a1i1 (C3417T) - Yakut (Vilyuy), Buryat (Eastern Buryat from Buryat Republic)
Haplogroup G2a1j (C5840T) - Thailand (Tai Yuan from North Thailand), China
Haplogroup G2a1k (A8521G) - Poland
Haplogroup G2a1l (C10043T) - Russia (Pskov Oblast), Norway (Buskerud)
Haplogroup G2a1m (C8766T) - Buryat (Inner Mongolia)
Haplogroup G2a1m1 (C7229T) - Daur, Barga (Inner Mongolia), Buryat (Buryat Republic), Khamnigan (Zabaikal Region)
Haplogroup G2a1m1a (A4395G) - Kyrgyzstan (Kyrgyz)
Haplogroup G2a1n (T14180C) - Kyrgyzstan (Kyrgyz)
Haplogroup G2a1o (T173C) - China (Henan Province)
Haplogroup G2a1p (A374G) - Ladakh
Haplogroup G2a1q (T16356C) - Deng, China (Fujian)
Haplogroup G2a-T152C! - China (Eastern China), Thai (Chanthaburi)
Haplogroup G2a2 – China, Uyghur, Kyrgyz (Artux, Tashkurgan), Kazakhstan, Chelkan (Turochak, Biyka, Kurmach-Baigol), Nogai (Karachay-Cherkess Republic), Yakut (Vilyuy, Northeast, Central), Buryat (Kizhinginsky District, Olkhonsky District, Tunkinsky District, Bokhansky District), Hazara (Pakistan), Volga Tatar (Republic of Tatarstan), Hungary, Finland
Haplogroup G2a2a – China, Uyghur, Buryat (Bulagad from Bokhansky District), Soyot, Turkey, Bashkortostan, Poland
Haplogroup G2a2b (G12007A) – Buryat (Tunkinsky District, Ekhirit-Bulagatsky District)
Haplogroup G2a2c (T16136C) – Uyghur
Haplogroup G2a2d (C5456T) - Uyghur
Haplogroup G2a2d1 (T8978C) - Uyghur
Haplogroup G2a2e (T4772C) - Buryat (Ekhirid from Kurumkansky District, Bulagad/Ekhirid from Ekhirit-Bulagatsky District)
Haplogroup G2a-T152C!-C16262T - ancient DNA from Irkutsk Oblast (Irk067 from the Novyj Kachug site at the left bank of the upper Lena River, cal BC 3755 to cal BC 3640)
Haplogroup G2a3 – Russia (Tatarstan), Azerbaijanian (Iran), Uyghur (Artux)
Haplogroup G2a3a – Russia (Tyumen Oblast, Tatar from Buinsk), Sweden, Germany
Haplogroup G2a4 – China (Taihang area in Henan province), Taiwan (Taitung), Ukraine
Haplogroup G2a4b (T6707C) - China (Tianjin, Eastern China)
Haplogroup G2a5 – Japan, Korea, Kyrgyz, Kazakh, Karakalpak, Telengit, Tubalar, Yakut, Balkar (Kabardino-Balkaria), Buryat (Selenginsky District)
Haplogroup G2a5a – Buryat (Barguzinsky District, Kizhinginsky District)
Haplogroup G2a-T152C!-T1189C - Uyghur
Haplogroup G2a-T152C!-T1189C-A10804G - Buryat (Bulagad/Ekhirid from Ekhirit-Bulagatsky District, Bulagad/Ekhirid from Selenginsky District)
Haplogroup G2a-T152C!-T1189C-C6101T - Daurs
Haplogroup G2a-T152C!-T1189C-T16271C - China (Liaoning), Nivkh (Nogliki)
Haplogroup G2a-T152C!-C3351T - China (Jiangxi Province, Eastern China), Buryat (Ekhirid/Bulagad from Olkhonsky District)
Haplogroup G2a-T152C!-C10834T - China (Jilin), Thailand (Iu Mien from Nan Province)
Haplogroup G2-A3397G
Haplogroup G2-A3397G-T15262C - China, Mongol (Hulunbuir)
Haplogroup G2-A3397G-C6623T - Uyghurs
Haplogroup G2c – China (Taihang area in Henan province), Uyghurs
Haplogroup G2b [TMRCA 22,776.4 ± 5,059.2 ybp; CI=95%]
Haplogroup G2b1 – Tibetan (Shannan), Cambodia [TMRCA 16,830.4 ± 5,616.0 ybp; CI=95%]
Haplogroup G2b1a – China (Chongqing, Shaanxi), Thailand (Nyaw from Nakhon Phanom Province), Kyrgyzstan, Spain [TMRCA 13,366.8 ± 5,443.2 ybp; CI=95%]
Haplogroup G2b1a1 – Thailand (Tai Yuan from Uttaradit Province, Khon Mueang from Chiang Mai Province, Karen from Mae Hong Son Province), Myanmar (Karen from Kayin State and Bago Division)
Haplogroup G2b1a1a (C16239T) - Thailand (Skaw Karen from southern Mae Hong Son Province, Skaw Karen from northern Mae Hong Son Province), Myanmar (Karen from Kayin State)
Haplogroup G2b1a2 – Ewenki from Inner Mongolia
Haplogroup G2b1a2a (G2120A) - China
Haplogroup G2b1a3 (A4562T) - Taiwan (Hakka)
Haplogroup G2b1a4 (C4599T) - Thailand (Tai Khuen from Northern Thailand, Tai Lue from Chiang Rai Province)
Haplogroup G2b1a5 (T11353C) - China (Hebei Province), Dungan
Haplogroup G2b1b – Uyghurs, Tibetan (Shannan), India (Lachungpa) [TMRCA 4,662.1 ± 4,492.8 ybp; CI=95%]
Haplogroup G2b2 – Late Medieval eastern Mongolia (SHU001), Sweden, Russia, Scotland, Iraq, Japan [TMRCA 20,476.0 ± 5,481.6 ybp; CI=95%]
Haplogroup G2b2a – India (Gallong, Kathodi) [TMRCA 15,328.9 ± 6,057.6 ybp; CI=95%]
Haplogroup G2b2b – China, Japan (Chiba)
Haplogroup G2b2c – China (Taihang area in Henan province), Tatar (Buinsk)
Haplogroup G2b2d (T5641C) – Japan (Tokyo), Kyrgyz (Tashkurgan)
Haplogroup G2b2d1 (A6647T) - Uyghur, Kumandin (Soltonsky District), Todzhi (Adir-Kezhig), Buryat (Bulagad/Ekhirid from Ekhirit-Bulagatsky District)
Haplogroup G2d (A11443G) - Thailand (Tai Yuan in Central Thailand, Iu Mien in Phayao Province)
Haplogroup G2d1 (A328G) - Thailand (Tai Yuan in Central Thailand, Lisu in Mae Hong Son Province)
Haplogroup G3 [TMRCA 23,919.9 ± 6,931.2 ybp; CI=95%]
Haplogroup G3a
Haplogroup G3a1'2 – Pakistan (Azad Kashmir)
Haplogroup G3a1 [TMRCA 7,300 (95% CI 3,700 <-> 13,000) ybp]
Haplogroup G3a1a – Tibetan (Shigatse), Sherpa, Naxi, Hani
Haplogroup G3a1b – Tibet (Nagqu), Sarikoli (Tashkurgan)
Haplogroup G3a1c (C2389A) - skeletal remains of Bo people from Chang'an Township, Weixin County, Zhaotong, Yunnan, China and similar people from Yangxu Town, Youjiang District, Baise, Guangxi, China and Tham Lod rockshelter, Pang Mapha District, Mae Hong Son Province, Thailand
Haplogroup G3a1'2-A12661G - Uyghur
Haplogroup G3a2 [TMRCA 12,600 (95% CI 3,900 <-> 30,200) ybp]
Haplogroup G3a2* – Taiwan (Minnan)
Haplogroup G3a2-T152C!!!
Haplogroup G3a2-T152C!!!* – Udegey (Agzu), Korea, Japan
Haplogroup G3a2a – Japan, Korean, Uzbek
Haplogroup G3a2b (C13209T) - Uyghur
Haplogroup G3a2b1 (G13718C) - China (Eastern China, Shandong)
Haplogroup G3a3 [TMRCA 12,900 (95% CI 6,000 <-> 24,200) ybp] – China, Buryat (Khori from Khorinsky District), Ukraine, Poland, Slovakia, Albania, United Kingdom
Haplogroup G3a3a (G16156A) - China, Uyghur (Artux)
Haplogroup G3a3a1 (A390G) - Inner Mongolia
Haplogroup G3a3a1a (C2263A) - Uyghur
Haplogroup G3a3a1a1 (A3523G) - Bashkortostan
Haplogroup G3b [TMRCA 17,800 (95% CI 12,800 <-> 24,100) ybp] - India (Lachungpa), Tibetan (Lhasa), Lhoba
Haplogroup G3b1 – Tibet (Tibetan from Nyingchi, Tibetan from Tingri, Monpa, Deng), India (Dirang Monpa)
Haplogroup G3b2 - China, Tibet (Monpa, Qinghai), Thailand (Lawa from the southwest of Mae Hong Son Province, Tai Yuan from Central Thailand)
Haplogroup G4 – Japan [TMRCA 7,500 (95% CI 3,100 <-> 15,500) ybp]
Haplogroup G5 – Vietnam (Dao), Thailand (Lao Isan from Nakhon Ratchasima Province) [TMRCA 7,900 (95% CI 5,400 <-> 11,200) ybp]
Haplogroup M13'46'61
Haplogroup M13 – small clade found among Tibetans in Tibet, Oirat Mongols in Xinjiang, Barghuts in Hulunbuir, Koreans, and Yakuts and Dolgans in central Siberia [TMRCA 43,169.4 ± 4,944.0 ybp; CI=95%]
M13a [TMRCA 19,266.4 ± 6,720.0 ybp; CI=95%]
M13a1 – China [Uyghurs, Mongol, Tibetan (Chamdo, Nagqu)], India [TMRCA 9,539.2 ± 6,249.6 ybp; CI=95%]
M13a1a – Japan
M13a1b – China (Tibet, Uyghurs)
M13a1b1 – Buryat, Barghut, Yakut (Central), Evenk (Taimyr)
M13a2 – Tibet, Thailand [TMRCA 8,726.0 ± 4,828.8 ybp; CI=95%]
M13b [TMRCA 31,191.8 ± 6,873.6 ybp; CI=95%]
M13b1 – Nepal (Tharu), Northeast India, Thailand, Jahai [TMRCA 22,537.6 ± 7,123.2 ybp; CI=95%]
M13b2 – Sherdukpen, Dirang Monpa, Tibet [TMRCA 5,441.4 ± 3,888.0 ybp; CI=95%]
M13c – Myanmar, Thailand (Mon in Kanchanaburi Province), China (Lahu)
Haplogroup M46 – Myanmar, Moken, Urak Lawoi, Malagasy
Haplogroup M61 – Thailand (Phuan in Suphan Buri Province, Phuan in Phichit Province, Phuan in Sukhothai Province, Saek in Nakhon Phanom Province), Myanmar, Vietnam, Borneo
Haplogroup M61a – China (Yi, Tibet, Lachungpa)
Haplogroup M14 – Australia (Kalumburu), Saudi Arabia, India, Tibet?
Haplogroup M15 – Australia (Kalumburu), Tibet?
Haplogroup M17 – found in Luzon, Chams, Maniq, Mon, Blang, Lawa, Thai, and Laotians
Haplogroup M17a – Thailand, Vietnam (Cham)
Haplogroup M17c – Vietnam (Cham)
Haplogroup M17c1 – Philippines (Abaknon)
Haplogroup M17c1a – Indonesia
Haplogroup M17c1a1 – Philippines (Abaknon)
Haplogroup M17c1a1a – Cambodia (incl. Stieng)
Haplogroup M19'53
Haplogroup M19 – found in the Batak people of Palawan
Haplogroup M53 – India
Haplogroup M53b – Kamar of Chhattisgarh
Haplogroup M21  – small clade found in SE Asia (Semang, Semelai, Temuan, Jehai, Thailand, Maniq, Mon, Karen, Indonesia), China, and Bangladesh
Haplogroup M21a – Batek
Haplogroup M21b
Haplogroup M21b1 – Cambodia (Lao, Tompoun)
Haplogroup M21b1a – Semelai, Philippines (Cuyunon of Palawan Island), Indonesia
Haplogroup M21b2 – Moken, Cham, Malaysia, India
Haplogroup M22 – Drung (Yunnan)
Haplogroup M22a – Vietnam (Kinh, Cham), Temuan
Haplogroup M22b – Vietnam (Kinh), China (Han in Meizhou), Cambodia
Haplogroup M23'75 – China
M23 – found in Madagascar, South Africa, USA, Canada
M75 – found in China, USA
Haplogroup M24'41 
Haplogroup M24
Haplogroup M24a – found in Thailand, Cambodia (Khmer), Palawan (Tagbanua), and China
Haplogroup M24b – found in Thailand, Cambodia (Jarai), and China
Haplogroup M41 – found in South Asia
Haplogroup M41b – found in Andhra Pradesh, India
Haplogroup M41c – found in Andhra Pradesh, India
Haplogroup M27  – found in Melanesia
Haplogroup M28  – found in Melanesia and in a single Han individual from China
Haplogroup M29'Q
Haplogroup M29  – found in Melanesia
Haplogroup Q  – found in Melanesia and Australia (Aboriginal peoples)
Haplogroup M31  –  found among the Onge, in the Andaman Islands
Haplogroup M31a
Haplogroup M31a1
Haplogroup M31a1a – Andaman Islands
Haplogroup M31a1b – Andaman Islands
Haplogroup M31a2
Haplogroup M31a2a – northern India (Munda, etc.), Myanmar
Haplogroup M31a2b – India (Paudibhuiya)
Haplogroup M31b'c
Haplogroup M31b – northern India, Nepal, Myanmar
Haplogroup M31c – Nepal (Tharu)
Haplogroup M32'56 – Thailand
Haplogroup M32
Haplogroup M32a –  – found in the Andaman Islands
Haplogroup M32c – Madagascar, Saudi Arabia, Thailand/Laos, USA
Haplogroup M56 – India (Korku)
Haplogroup M33  – small clade found in South Asia, Belarus, southern China, and in two Han Chinese living in Southern California
Haplogroup M33a – found in Nepal (Tharu)
Haplogroup M33a1
Haplogroup M33a1a – Lepcha, Tharu
Haplogroup M33a1b – Dongri Bhil, Gujarat
Haplogroup M33a2'3
Haplogroup M33a2 – India (Katkari, etc.), Egypt (Siwa)
Haplogroup M33a2a – India, Iraq (Marsh Arab), Saudi Arabia
Haplogroup M33a3 – found among Hindus in New Delhi, India
Haplogroup M33a3a – Myanmar, Toto
Haplogroup M33a3b – found in Thailand and in Tajiks in Dushanbe, Tajikistan
Haplogroup M33b'c
Haplogroup M33b – Nepal (Tharu)
Haplogroup M33b1 – Sonowal Kachari, Dai (Jianshui)
Haplogroup M33b2 – India, Nepal (Kathmandu)
Haplogroup M33c – Jews (Lithuania, Russia, Belarus, Ukraine, USA, Hungary, Austria, Latvia, Poland), Han Chinese (Zhanjiang), Yao (Jianghua)
Haplogroup M33d – India (Malpaharia, etc.)
Haplogroup M34'57
Haplogroup M34  – small clade found in South Asia
Haplogroup M34a – found in Karnataka, India
Haplogroup M34a1 – India
Haplogroup M34a1a – India, Myanmar
Haplogroup M34a2 – India (Pauri Bhuiya, Munda)
Haplogroup M34b – India (Nihal, etc.)
Haplogroup M57 – India (Kathakur)
Haplogroup M57a – India (Katkari, Nihal), England, Ireland
Haplogroup M57b – India (Kathakur)
Haplogroup M57b1 – India (Dongri Bhil)
Haplogroup M35  – Nepal (Tharu)
Haplogroup M35a – Sarikoli, Armenia, Mesolithic Sri Lanka
Haplogroup M35a1 – India (Andh, Dongri Bhil), Mauritius
Haplogroup M35a1a – India (Betta Kurumba, Mullukurunan)
Haplogroup M35a2 – India (Andh, etc.)
Haplogroup M35b – found in Karnataka, Ladakh, Nepal (Tharu), Myanmar, Thailand, Slovakia
Haplogroup M35b1'2'3 – India, Germany, USA
Haplogroup M35b1 – India (Madia)
Haplogroup M35b2 – India (Kathodi, Munda), Russia
Haplogroup M35b3 – India (Ladakh)
Haplogroup M35b4 – India (Toto), Nepal (Kathmandu)
Haplogroup M35c – India (Kathodi, Andh)
Haplogroup M39'70 
Haplogroup M39  – found in South Asia
Haplogroup M70 - Nepal (Sherpas, etc.), Tibet, Vietnam (La Hủ)
Haplogroup M40  – found in South Asia
Haplogroup M40a – Yemen
Haplogroup M40a1
Haplogroup M40a1a
Haplogroup M40a1b
Haplogroup M42'74 
Haplogroup M42  – Sri Lanka
Haplogroup M42a – Australian Aboriginal peoples
Haplogroup M42b
Haplogroup M42b1
Haplogroup M42b2
Haplogroup M74 - Cambodia (Kampong Thom, Brao), Thailand (Lao Isan, Central Thai), Vietnam (Thái)
Haplogroup M74a - Thailand (Hmong, Iu Mien, Lao Isan from Nakhon Ratchasima Province), Vietnam (Cờ Lao, Nùng, H'Mông, Mang), China, Taiwan
Haplogroup M74b
Haplogroup M74b1
Haplogroup M74b2
Haplogroup M48  – rare clade found in Saudi Arabia
Haplogroup M49 – found among ancient specimens in the Euphrates valley
Haplogroup M55'77 
Haplogroup M55 - Myanmar, Thailand, Malay
Haplogroup M77 - Indonesia 
Haplogroup M62'68 
Haplogroup M62 
Haplogroup M68 
Haplogroup M68a1
Haplogroup M68a1a - Cambodia, Vietnam
Haplogroup M68a1b
Haplogroup M68a2
Haplogroup M68a2a- Cambodia
Haplogroup M68a2b
Haplogroup M68a2c
Haplogroup M71 - India
Haplogroup M71a'b (M71-C151T) - India, Myanmar, Cambodia (Mel), Laos (Lao in Vientiane), Thailand (Lawa, Karen, Shan,  Blang, Phuan, Lao Isan, Khon Mueang), Vietnam (Ede)
Haplogroup M71a - Thailand (Thai, Tai Yuan, Khon Mueang), China (Fujian)
Haplogroup M71a1 - China (Han from Xiamen and Lanzhou, Naxi)
Haplogroup M71a1a - China (Bouyei from Pingtang, etc.), Vietnam (Mang, Kinh), Thailand (Phuan from Central Thailand)
Haplogroup M71a2 - India, Myanmar, Thailand (Thai from Central Thailand and Eastern Thailand, Tai Yuan and Tai Khün from Northern Thailand, Blang), Indonesia, Philippines
Haplogroup M71b - Thailand (Thai from Western Thailand, Khon Mueang from Chiang Mai Province, Tai Yuan, Tai Khün), China (Bouyei from Pingtang, Han from Dongguan)
Haplogroup M71c - Thailand (Urak Lawoi, Moken, Thai from Central Thailand), Vietnam (Cham from Bình Thuận, Kinh)
Haplogroup M73'79 
Haplogroup M73 
Haplogroup M73a
Haplogroup M73a1
Haplogroup M73a1a
Haplogroup M73a1b - Vietnam
Haplogroup M73a2 - Papua New Guinea, East Timor
Haplogroup M73a3 - Philippines (Aklan)
Haplogroup M73b - Indonesia
Haplogroup M73b1 - Vietnam, Cambodia, Indonesia
Haplogroup M73c
Haplogroup M79 - China 
Haplogroup M80'D
Haplogroup M80 – found in Batak people of Palawan
Haplogroup D – found in Eastern Eurasia, Native Americans, Central Asia and occasionally also in West Asia and Europe.

Subclades

Tree
This phylogenetic tree of haplogroup M subclades is based on the paper by Mannis van Oven and Manfred Kayser Updated comprehensive phylogenetic tree of global human mitochondrial DNA variation and subsequent published research.

M
M1
M1a
M1a1
M1a1a
M1a1b
M1a1b1
M1a1c
M1a1d
M1a1e
M1a1f
M1a2
M1a2a
M1a2b
M1a3
M1a3a
M1a3b
M1a4
M1a5
M1b
M1b1
M1b1a
M1b2
M1b2a
M2
M2a
M2a1
M2a2
M2a3
M2b
M2b1
M2b2
M3
M3a
M4"45
M4
M4a
M4b
M4b1
M18'38
M18
M38
M30
M30a
M30b
M30c
M30c1
M30c1a
M30c1a1
M30d
M37
M37a
M43
M45
M5
M5a
M5a1
M5a1a
M5a1b
M5a2
M5a2a
M6
M7
M7a
M7a1
M7a1a
M7a1a1
M7a1a1a
M7a1a2
M7a1a3
M7a1a4
M7a1a4a
M7a1a5
M7a1a6
M7a1a7
M7a1b
M7a2
M7a2a
M7a2b
M7b'c'd'e
M7b'd
M7b
M7b1'2
M7b1
M7b2
M7b2a
M7b2b
M7b2c
M7b3
M7b3a
M7d
M7c'e
M7c
M7c1
M7c1a
M7c1b
M7c1b1
M7c2
M7c2a
M7c3
M7c3a
M7c3b
M7c3c
M7e
M8
M8a
M8a1
M8a2
M8a2a
M8a2b
CZ
C
Z
M9
M9a'b'c'd
M9a'c'd
M9a'd
M9a
M9a1
M9a2
M9a3
M9d
M9c
M9b
E
M10'42
M10
M10a
M10a1
M10a2
M42
M42a
M11
M11a
M11b
M12'G
M12
M12a
G
M13
M13a
M13a1
M14
M15
M21
M21a'b
M21a
M21b
M21c'd
M21c
M21d
M22
M23
M25
M27
M27a
M27b
M27c
M28
M28a
M28b
M29'Q
M29
M29a
M29b
Q
M31
M31a
M31a1
M31a1a
M31a1b
M31a2
M31b'c
M31b
M31b1
M31b2
M31c
M32'56
M32
M32a
M32c
M56
M33
M33a
M33b
M33c
M34
M34a
M35
M35a
M35b
M36
M36a
M39
M39a
M40
M40a
M41
M44'52
M44
M52
M46
M47'50
M47
M50
M48
M49
M51
M52’58
M52
D

See also

Genealogical DNA test
Genetic genealogy
Human mitochondrial genetics
Population genetics
Human mitochondrial DNA haplogroups

References

External links
General
Ian Logan's Mitochondrial DNA Site
The India DNA geographical project at Family Tree DNA
The China DNA geographical project at Family Tree DNA
Haplogroup M
Mannis van Oven's PhyloTree.org - mtDNA subtree M
Spread of Haplogroup M, from National Geographic
Tree of M haplogroup as for 2006
Haplogroup M (mtDNA) interest group on Facebook
Another tree emphasizing the Andamanese and Nicobarese populations in comparison with other peoples with high M presence
K.Tharanghaj et al. In situ origin of deep rooting lineages of mitochondrial Macrohaplogroup M in India (PDF document)

M